Kianida Reef is the 350 m long in east-west direction and 140 m wide, narrowing to the east rocky reef lying in Osogovo Bay, off the southeast extremity of Rugged Island in the South Shetland Islands. Its surface area is 4 ha. The area was visited by early 19th century sealers.

The feature is named after the phantom island of Kianida or Cianeis off the Black Sea coast of Thrace, featured on a 1467 map by Nicolaus Germanus based on Claudius Ptolemy's Geography.

Location
Detailed Spanish mapping in 1992, and Bulgarian mapping in 2009 and 2017.

Maps
 Península Byers, Isla Livingston. Mapa topográfico a escala 1:25000. Madrid: Servicio Geográfico del Ejército, 1992
 L. Ivanov. Antarctica: Livingston Island and Greenwich, Robert, Snow and Smith Islands. Scale 1:120000 topographic map. Troyan: Manfred Wörner Foundation, 2010.  (First edition 2009. )
 L. Ivanov. Antarctica: Livingston Island and Smith Island. Scale 1:100000 topographic map. Manfred Wörner Foundation, 2017. 
 Antarctic Digital Database (ADD). Scale 1:250000 topographic map of Antarctica. Scientific Committee on Antarctic Research (SCAR). Since 1993, regularly upgraded and updated

See also
 List of Antarctic and subantarctic islands

Notes

References
 Kianida Reef. SCAR Composite Gazetteer of Antarctica
 Bulgarian Antarctic Gazetteer. Antarctic Place-names Commission. (details in Bulgarian, basic data in English)

External links
 Kianida Reef. Adjusted Copernix satellite image

Islands of the South Shetland Islands
Bulgaria and the Antarctic